Brändström may refer to:
 Charlotte Brändström (born 1959), Swedish-French film director
 Elsa Brändström (1888–1948), Swedish nurse and philanthropist
 (8831) Brändström, asteroid of the main asteroid belt see Meanings of minor planet names: 8001–9000#831